Kalyayev is a Russian masculine surname, its feminine counterpart is Kalyayeva. Notable people with the surname include:

Ivan Kalyayev (1877–1905), Russian poet and revolutionary 
Levan Kalyayev (1929–1983), Soviet sprinter

Russian-language surnames